Borya Ider (born in 1994 in Mongolia) is a French chess International master since 2014 and a FIDE master since 2011. He is the 30th best French player. His highest rating was 2515 (in October 2017).

In the 2014 World Junior Championship he ranked 29th with a score of 7.5/13. In the 2017 Tradewise Gibraltar he ranked 77th with a score of 5.5/10. Ider won the 22nd Franconville open.

References

Living people
1994 births
Chess International Masters
French chess players